Udarnik is a rural locality (a selo), and one of three settlements in Bayagantaysky Rural Okrug of Tomponsky District in the Sakha Republic, Russia, in addition to Krest-Khaldzhan, the administrative center of the Rural Okrug and Ary-Tolon. Its population as of the 2002 Census was 159. It is named after the Russian word for a hard worker.

References

Notes

Sources
Official website of the Sakha Republic. Registry of the Administrative-Territorial Divisions of the Sakha Republic. Tomponsky District. 

Rural localities in Tomponsky District